Darcie Dohnal (later Sharapova; born June 28, 1972) is an American short track speed skater who competed in the 1992 Winter Olympics.

At the age of 10 she began skating in Wauwatosa, Wisconsin, her hometown. In 1992 she was a member of the American relay team which won the silver medal in the 3000 metre relay competition.

References 
 

1972 births
Living people
American female short track speed skaters
Olympic silver medalists for the United States in short track speed skating
Short track speed skaters at the 1992 Winter Olympics
Medalists at the 1992 Winter Olympics
20th-century American women